Robin Driscoll (born 28 June 1957) is a British actor and writer. He is best known as a writer of Mr. Bean episodes with Rowan Atkinson.

He and Atkinson are close friends; they appeared in Funny Business (1992). As an actor, Driscoll  appeared in episodes of Only Fools and Horses ("The Jolly Boys' Outing"), Murder Most Horrid, Dear John, Alas Smith & Jones, and The Fast Show.

References

External links
 

1951 births
Living people
British male television actors
British writers
Place of birth missing (living people)